Libertyland was an amusement park located in Memphis, Tennessee.  Opened on July 4, 1976, it was located at 940 Early Maxwell Blvd.  It was structured under the nonprofit 501(c)4 US tax code. It closed due to financial reasons in 2005.

History
Libertyland opened as an amusement park on the Mid-South Fairgrounds on July 4, 1976. Before then, the fair had operated on the land, including the Coaster Pippin renamed Zippin Pippin with the opening of Libertyland and the Grand Carousel. The city of Memphis decided it was time for a theme park for the city. It opened in 1976 with several rides, including the pre-existing rides that had operated in that place before. The Zippin Pippin was widely popular as it was Elvis Presley's favorite wooden roller coaster. In fact, on August 8, 1977, just eight days before his death, Elvis rented Libertyland as a gift for his 9 year old daughter, Lisa Marie Presley. From 1 am until dawn, Elvis, Lisa Marie, Elvis' then-fiance Ginger Alden and about a dozen friends rode the park's then fourteen rides. The Grand Carousel was also a classic and was widely appreciated. The park gradually drew in decent crowds over the years, but never made a great profit. It continued to add attractions, such as a steel coaster called the Revolution, and others. During the late 1990s, it added a Top Spin ride, dubbed "Tidal Wave."  It was removed later, and in April 2002, the drop tower Rebellion was added. It featured a  drop and drew larger crowds to the park.

Attractions

Libertyland featured around 24 attractions.

Bumper Boats
Car-Go-Round
Casey's Cannonball Train Ride
Dragon Wagon
Fun Run
Grand Carousel
Kamikaze - Fabbri Kamikaze
Little Bumper Boats
Old Hickory Log Flume
Paratrooper
Park's Peak
Pirate Ship
Rebellion - Drop Tower
Red Baron
Revolution - Arrow Loop & Corkscrew
Screamer
Sea Dragon
Surf City Water Slide
Tennessee Tilt - Tilt-A-Whirl
Thriller     
Turnpike Antique Cars
Twain's Twister - Eli Bridge Scrambler
Umbrella Ride
Wipeout - Chance Wipeout   
Zippin Pippin - Wooden Coaster

Financial troubles
For many years, it was widely known that Libertyland was having financial difficulties, failing to turn a profit. Few new attractions were being added, and crowds began to diminish. In 2005, it commissioned a firm to redo its image. A new logo was designed and buildings were repainted, but the effort did not bring in enough of a profit, if any, to maintain the park as a viable ongoing operation. Although the operating loss was minimal compared to the tax revenue generated in the area around the park by tourists. The city later spent more than the operating loss on a youth jobs creation program to replace the jobs lost by teenagers who worked at the park.

Closure
The park operated its last day for a corporate day on October 29, 2005. In early November, a meeting was called before the Mid-South Fair board of committee to close it. The vote was passed and the announcement was made public. Their reasonings included lack of profit, a steady decline of attendance, and they wanted to extend the midway for the annual Mid-South Fair which operates adjacent to the park's site for 10 days in October.  Its closure followed that of Adventure River, Memphis' only water park by less than ten years. The City of Memphis had also closed Bud Boogie Beach in the early 1990s.

Grass Roots Effort
Within days of the announcement to close the park, a group formed to save it. Save Libertyland! fought against Mid-South Fair to keep it open, citing that it drew in hundreds of jobs for the Memphis area teens and was one of the few places for families to spend time there.  Several benefits were held to gain support for the movement. The park brought in a few companies willing to purchase it, mainly Joyland, Inc. (T-Rex Entertainment), which was known for buying financially troubled amusement parks and turning them around. Though there was a debate over who actually had rights to the rides since, in reality, the city actually owned some of them. Mid-South Fair did not back down and went on with plans to auction the assets off.

Auction & Post-Movement
Mid-South Fair brought in an auctioneer group and the auction was held on June 21, 2006. Most of the rides were sold, including the Zippin Pippin, which sold for only $2,500. It was bought by a traveling rock museum who only wanted one of the train's cars. Carolina Crossroads later bought it but decided not to move it. It has now been bought by the city of Green Bay, Wisconsin, which rebuilt it at their city-owned Bay Beach Amusement Park. The Revolution was bought by DelGrosso's Amusement Park but has yet to be erected as of April 2010. Other rides were dispersed to other locations around the country. The Rebellion was sold to Ghost Town in the Sky and reopened in 2007.

In December 2006, Joyland Inc. made a bold move and sent the city a letter of intent stating their intention of reopening the park, more as a new amusement park on the former site. The deal was to be completed on a three-year lease plan. However, upon viewing it in person, Joyland Inc. pulled out of the deal due to extensive damage including infrastructure damage, wiring, and plumbing.

Outcome
The Grand Carousel was bought by The Children's Museum Of Memphis and has been in operation for many years following its closure. The Revolution was bought by an amusement park in the Philippines and now operates as The Zimerman Corkscrew Coaster. The Zippin Pippin is in Wisconsin and is still operating to this day. People with Tennessee State IDs or drivers licenses can ride the Pippin for free. 

The area is now a massive parking lot and green space known as Tiger Lane that has also added a disc golf course named Libertyland to a large part of it on the south end.

References

External links
Remember Libertyland - A Libertyland Tribute

Defunct amusement parks in the United States
History of Memphis, Tennessee
Amusement parks in Tennessee
Landmarks in Tennessee
Buildings and structures in Memphis, Tennessee
1976 establishments in Tennessee
2005 disestablishments in Tennessee